Louisiana's 15th State Senate district is one of 39 districts in the Louisiana State Senate. It has been represented by Democrat Regina Barrow since 2016, succeeding fellow Democrat Sharon Weston Broome.

Geography
District 15 covers northern East Baton Rouge Parish, including parts of Baton Rouge, Central, and Zachary, and all of Baker. 

The district overlaps with Louisiana's 2nd and 6th congressional districts, and with the 29th, 61st, 62nd, 63rd, 64th, 65th, 69th, and 101st districts of the Louisiana House of Representatives.

Recent election results
Louisiana uses a jungle primary system. If no candidate receives 50% in the first round of voting, when all candidates appear on the same ballot regardless of party, the top-two finishers advance to a runoff election.

2019

2015

2011

Federal and statewide results in District 15

References

Louisiana State Senate districts
East Baton Rouge Parish, Louisiana